The Game is a Big Finish Productions audio drama based on the long-running British science fiction television series Doctor Who.

Plot
The Fifth Doctor and Nyssa find themselves caught up in the politics between the Gora and the Lineen, which expresses itself in the form of the planetary obsession — the arena sport known as Naxy. While the Doctor discovers that the game has very deadly penalties, Nyssa has to deal with famed negotiator Lord Carlisle, who claims that the Doctor is his best friend.

Cast
The Doctor — Peter Davison
Nyssa — Sarah Sutton
Ambassador Faye Davis — Ursula Burton
Ockle Dirr — Robert Curbishley
Coach Bela Destry — Gregory Donaldon
Morian — Christopher Ellison
Hollis Az — Andrew Lothian
Garny Diblick — Jonathan Pearce
Lord Darzil Carlisle — William Russell
Coach Sharz Sevix — Dickon Tolson

External links
Big Finish Productions – The Game

2005 audio plays
Fifth Doctor audio plays